Hubertus von Baumbach (born 1967) is a German businessman who is the chairman and CEO of Boehringer Ingelheim, Germany's second largest pharmaceutical company.

Early life and education
The son of Erich von Baumbach and Ulrike Boehringer, Hubertus von Baumbach is also a great-grandson of the company's founder Albert Boehringer. He has a law degree and an MBA from the Massachusetts Institute of Technology.

Career
Baumbach joined Boehringer Ingelheim in 2001.

In November 2015, it was announced that Baumbach, who had been CFO, was appointed as chief executive, succeeding Andreas Barner in June 2016. At the time, this made him the first member of the family at the helm in 25 years. Within his first six months, he launched the biggest acquisition in the company's history (an asset swap deal with French rival Sanofi), followed by a reorganization to give the group a more decentralized divisional structure.

In his capacity at Boehringer Ingelheim, Baumbach was part of Chancellor Angela Merkel’s delegation on three state visits to China.

Other activities

Corporate boards
 Deutsche Bank, Member of the Advisory Board
 Baden-Württembergische Bank, Member of the Advisory Board 
 Landesbank Baden-Württemberg (LBBW), Member of the Advisory Board
 KWS Saat, Member of the supervisory board (2007-2017)

Non-profit organizations 
 Federation of German Industries (BDI), Member of the Presidium (2018-2019)
 German Chemical Industry Association (VCI), Member of the Executive Committee 
 Baden-Badener Unternehmer-Gespräche (BBUG), Member of the Board of Trustees
 Cultural Foundation of the Federal States, Member of the Board of Trustees
 Städel Museum, Member of the Administration and the Board of Trustees
 Stiftung Tausendgut, Member of the Board of Trustees

References

1960s births
German chief executives
MIT Sloan School of Management alumni
Boehringer Ingelheim people
Living people